HMS Inflexible was a 64-gun third rate ship of the line of the Royal Navy, launched on 7 March 1780 at Harwich.

In 1783, she fought in the Battle of Cuddalore.

Because Inflexible served in the navy's Egyptian campaign (8 March to 8 September 1801), her officers and crew qualified for the clasp "Egypt" to the Naval General Service Medal that the Admiralty authorized in 1850 to all surviving claimants.

In 1807 she was present at the Battle of Copenhagen, joining on 7 August off Helsingor (Captain Joshua Rowley Watson).

Inflexible became a storeship in 1793, and was eventually broken up in 1820.

Notes and citations
Notes

Citations

References

Lavery, Brian (2003) The Ship of the Line - Volume 1: The development of the battlefleet 1650-1850. Conway Maritime Press. .

Ships of the line of the Royal Navy
Inflexible-class ships of the line
1780 ships
Ships built in Harwich